The 2007 LG Hockey Games was played between February 8 and February 11, 2007 in Stockholm, Sweden.

Sweden won the tournament undefeated, after victories against the Czech Republic (6-1), Russia (6-2) and Finland (1-0). The tournament became a major success for Sweden's Johan Davidsson, who scored for points and was also appointed for the tournaments all star-team. The game Sweden-Ryssland also became his 100th international.

Final standings

Matches

Best players 

 The tournament directorate nominated the following players

 Best goaltender:  Marek Pinc
 Best defenceman:  Kenny Jönsson
 Best forward:  Fredrik Bremberg

 The media All Star Team was named as follows

  Marek Pinc, Goaltender
  Magnus Johansson, Defenceman
  Kenny Jönsson, Defenceman
  Fredrik Bremberg, Forward
  Johan Davidsson, Forward
  Nikolai Kulemin, Forward

References

External links
Hockeyarchives 
Official Games Reports
2007 LG Hockey Games awards

2006–07 Euro Hockey Tour
2006–07 in Swedish ice hockey
2006–07 in Russian ice hockey
2006–07 in Finnish ice hockey
2006–07 in Czech ice hockey
Sweden Hockey Games
February 2007 sports events in Europe
2000s in Stockholm